Ruszcza-Kępa  is a village in the administrative district of Gmina Połaniec, within Staszów County, Świętokrzyskie Voivodeship, in south-central Poland.

References

Villages in Staszów County